Owen Lancelot Sheehy-Skeffington (19 May 1909 – 7 June 1970) was an Irish university lecturer and senator. The son of pacifists, feminists and socialists Francis and Hanna Sheehy-Skeffington, he was politically likeminded and as a member of the Irish Senate was praised as a defender of civil liberty, Democracy, separation of church and state, freedom of speech, women's rights, minority rights and many other liberal values.

Early life

Sheehy-Skeffington was brought up in Dublin, Ireland. His father, Francis Sheehy-Skeffington, was a Pacifist, Feminist and Socialist whose execution by firing squad, on the orders of Captain J.C. Bowen-Colthurst, during the week of the Easter Rising in 1916, became a cause célèbre. His mother was the suffragette Hanna Sheehy-Skeffington who founded the Irish Women's Franchise League. His maternal grandfather was David Sheehy, a longstanding member of Parliament for the Irish Parliamentary Party.

As a three-year-old, Francis had taken Owen to see his mother while she was incarcerated at Mountjoy Prison, having been sentenced to two months imprisonment for her actions in defence of women's rights. At five years old he was taken by Hanna to see Francis while he was incarcerated at Mountjoy because of his campaign against conscription during World War I.

After her husband's murder, Hanna became increasingly Republican, supporting the anti-Treaty IRA during the Irish Civil War and Republican and Socialist causes long thereafter.

Through his childhood, Sheehy-Skeffington circulated through a number of prestigious schools, including time spent at Boyland School in Santa Barbara, California and in Dublin, at Sandford Park School, a non-denominational school selected by his mother in the face of strong criticism from her Catholic and Republican friends. His cousin, the diplomat, writer and politician Conor Cruise O'Brien, was a pupil there at the same time. His mother deliberately chose schools viewed as socially progressive for Owen, something that instilled in him lifelong values.

In 1927 he enrolled in Trinity College Dublin, where besides his studies in English and French he excelled in the university's debating society, created several new student organisations and publications, and developed a reputation for activism. He graduated in 1931 as a first-class honours Bachelor of the Arts in English and French.

Academic career and adult life
In the following two years he moved to Paris, where he was a graduate assistant at the École Normale Supérieure, allowing him to renew contact with Samuel Beckett, whose lectures he had attended at Trinity, and to meet James Joyce who had been a contemporary and friend of his father at University College. It was around this time that he began his doctoral studies studying the work of l'Abbaye de Créteil, which he later converted into a thesis on the work of ‘Jules Romains, the Apostle of Unanimisme’, for which he was awarded a PhD at Trinity in 1935.

It was also in 1935 that Sheehy-Skeffington married Andrée Denis, a French graduate of the Sorbonne and a daughter of friends of his parents from Amiens. It was at Amiens Town Hall the two were wed on 23 March. The early years of their marriage were rough; they survived on Owen's low paid salary as a junior academic at Trinity back in Ireland, and both their relationship and his career was interrupted by Owen suffering a collapsed lung which required him to sojourn to Switzerland for specialist treatment in 1937 and 1938. However, by 1939 Owen was able to resume work at Trinity, becoming a lecturer in French.

Like her husband, Andrée Sheehy-Skeffington was a socially-involved campaigner and an active member of the Irish Housewives Association. She later wrote a biography of her husband, Skeff: A Life of Owen Sheehy Skeffington, 1909–1970. They resided at Hazelbrook Cottage, Terenure, Dublin. The couple had three children together, two boys and a girl: Francis Eugene, born in 1945, Alan Richard Louis, born in 1947 and Micheline Joan, born in 1953.

Political career
In 1943 Sheehy-Skeffington was expelled from the Labour Party, the reasons for which were often disputed. The Irish historian Diarmaid Ferriter suggests he was expelled for engaging in a public spat with a Catholic Priest over the nature of Socialism. Other sources suggest Communists in Dublin, who had entered the Labour Party under the doctrine of entryism, had ousted him because they perceived him to be veering towards Trotskyism. Others, such as Noel Browne, suggested he had been expelled for "simply being too liberal". Sheehy-Skeffington did refer him to himself as a "Liberal Socialist", which in more present times might be best understood to mean a proponent of Left-libertarianism.

In 1954 Sheehy-Skeffington moved into formal parliamentarian politics when was elected as a member of the 8th Seanad Éireann by the Dublin University constituency, thus beginning a long career as one of the leading lights of the Irish Senate.  He was re-elected in 1957, but lost his seat in 1961. He was returned to the 11th Seanad in 1965 and was re-elected for a final time in 1969. In the Seanad he was known as a champion of civil liberties and an opponent of authoritarianism.

Amongst many issues, he campaigned for an end to corporal punishment in Irish schools, an end of control by the Catholic Church of government-funded schools, stood against censorship, denounced terrorism, championed women's rights and opposed Apartheid.

On matters of the "Irish Question", Sheehy-Skeffington cited James Connolly's analysis and suggested both the Republic of Ireland and Northern Ireland each needed political reform first, then merged, rather than the other way around. Still citing Connolly, he also voiced the view that Irish Independence from the United Kingdom meant nothing if all it amounted to was to change the colour of the flag flying over its institutions, and instead, the change must also be a meaningful change in conditions for the people of Ireland.  He also noted that at least 4 of the 6 counties which made up Northern Ireland were made up of solid majorities of Protestant Unionists who he argued could not be coerced, by violence or otherwise, into the Irish state and that Republicans needed to accept this reality and alter their tactics accordingly, with more emphasis given to social conditions.

He was an atheist and helped set up the Humanist Association of Ireland. He was also a co-founder and active member of the Irish Association for Civil Liberty, which he co-founded in 1948 with the writer Seán Ó Faoláin and others.

In the late 1950s the memorialist Peter Tyrrell began a long-lasting correspondence with him. Sheehy-Skeffington encouraged Tyrrell to write his autobiography, which was published posthumously and helped to expose the brutal conditions in Irish Industrial schools, and in Letterfrack in particular. After Tyrrell committed suicide in 1967 the only clue to his identity was a card addressed to Sheehy-Skeffington.

On the eve of Sheehy-Skeffington's death the Arms Crisis was beginning to play out and one of Sheehy-Skeffington's final acts was to send a letter to Taoiseach Jack Lynch expressing support for his actions taken against Charles Haughey and Neil Blaney, dismissing them from cabinet.

Death and legacy
Sheehy-Skeffington died suddenly on 7 June 1970 as a result of a heart attack. Numerous tributes were paid to him from across the Irish political spectrum; Thomas Mullins, the Leader of the Seanad at the time, paid tribute to Sheehy-Skeffington by stating 

Professor George Dawson, Charman of the Academic Staff Association at Trinity, said of him

Sheehy-Skeffington's death triggered a by-election for his senate seat; on 19 November 1970 Trevor West was elected to Sheehy-Skeffington's vacant seat. Befitting Sheehy-Skeffington's legacy, in his own time Senator West was considered one of the few "liberal" voices in the Senate during the 70s and early 80s.

Memorial Award
Since 1973, Trinity College Dublin has offered the Owen Sheehy-Skeffington Memorial Award - a bursary worth 1,500 euros awarded annually - as a maintenance grant or as a travel award in alternate years. The criteria for the award include a combination of academic promise and financial need. The maintenance grant is available to senior freshmen or junior sophisters studying French at Trinity College, while the travelling scholarship may be granted to any student attending a centre of higher education in Ireland.

Misc
The National Library of Ireland houses Sheehy-Skeffington's papers. His daughter, Micheline Sheehy-Skeffington, challenged perceived gender inequality at NUI Galway. She was one of 46 people from across the campus to apply for a post of senior lectureship in 2008, was shortlisted for interview, was interviewed, but - upon being unsuccessful - took a case which pressured Galway to introduce gender quotas for promotion schemes and "inclusivity and unconscious bias training programmes" for workers.

Sources
 Andrée Sheehy-Skeffington: Skeff: The Life of Owen Sheehy-Skeffington, 1909-1970 [biography written by his widow] (Dublin: Lilliput Press, 1991).
 Lilliput Press website page for Skeff

Notes

References

1909 births
1970 deaths
Academics of Trinity College Dublin
People educated at Sandford Park School
Scholars of Trinity College Dublin
Independent members of Seanad Éireann
Irish atheists
Irish secularists
Irish socialist feminists
Irish humanists
Irish pacifists
Irish socialists
Members of Seanad Éireann for Dublin University
Members of the 11th Seanad
Members of the 12th Seanad
Members of the 8th Seanad
Members of the 9th Seanad